is a railway station located in Nakama, Fukuoka.

Lines 

Chikuhō Electric Railroad
Chikuhō Electric Railroad Line

Platforms

Adjacent stations

Surrounding area
 Kibōgaoka High School
 Hallo Day Nakao Supermarket

 Railway stations in Fukuoka Prefecture
 Railway stations in Japan opened in 1958